Son of a Trickster is a 2017 coming of age novel by Indigenous Canadian author Eden Robinson. The first novel in The Trickster trilogy, it follows 16-year-old Jared, who wades through the complications of a broken family, social pressure, drugs, alcohol, and poverty. The novel interweaves the Indigenous myth from Haisla/Heitsuk oral storytelling, as Jared discovers the Haisla trickster, Wee'jit. The story is set in Kitimat, British Columbia.

It took Robinson eight years to write, and is followed by the 2018 novel, Trickster Drift. The third and final novel, titled Return of the Trickster, was published in 2021.

Reception and awards 
The novel was selected for the 2020 edition of Canada Reads, in which it was defended by actress Kaniehtiio Horn.

Television adaptation 
Filmmaker Michelle Latimer and Streel Films secured the rights to adapt the book into a TV series. The series premiered on CBC Television as Trickster in 2020.

Awards and nominations 
 2017 Giller Prize shortlist
 2018 BC Book Prizes - Ethel Wilson Fiction Prize shortlist 
 2018 Ontario Library Association’s Evergreen Award shortlist
 2018 Sunburst Award shortlist

References 

2017 Canadian novels
Novels by Eden Robinson
Canadian bildungsromans
Canadian fantasy novels
Novels set in British Columbia
Alfred A. Knopf books